Germany participated in the Eurovision Song Contest 2014 with the song "Is It Right", written by Elżbieta Steinmetz, Frank Kretschmer and Adam Kesselhaut. The song was performed by Elaiza. The German entry for the 2014 contest in Copenhagen, Denmark was selected through the national final Unser Song für Dänemark, organised by the German broadcaster ARD in collaboration with Norddeutscher Rundfunk (NDR). The national final included a Club Concert wildcard round which took place on 27 February 2014 and featured ten undiscovered artists. Gaining 23.6% of the public vote, Elaiza was selected to compete in the final alongside seven established acts which took place on 13 March 2014 with the winner being selected through three rounds of public voting. "Is It Right" performed by Elaiza was selected as the German entry for Copenhagen after placing among the top four during the first round of voting, among the top two during the second round of voting and ultimately gaining 55% of the vote in the third round.

As a member of the "Big Five", Germany automatically qualified to compete in the final of the Eurovision Song Contest. Performing in position 12, Germany placed eighteenth out of the 26 participating countries with 39 points.

Background 

Germany has won the contest on two occasions: in 1982 with the song "Ein bißchen Frieden" performed by Nicole and in 2010 with the song "Satellite" performed by Lena. Germany, to this point, has been noted for having competed in the contest more than any other country; they have competed in every contest since the first edition in 1956 except for the 1996 contest when the nation was eliminated in a pre-contest elimination round. In 2013, the German entry "Glorious" performed by Cascada placed twenty-first out of twenty-six competing songs scoring 18 points.

The German national broadcaster, ARD, broadcasts the event within Germany and delegates the selection of the nation's entry to the regional broadcaster Norddeutscher Rundfunk (NDR). NDR confirmed that Germany would participate in the 2014 Eurovision Song Contest on 4 September 2013. In 2013, NDR had set up a national final with several artists to choose both the song and performer to compete at Eurovision for Germany. On 6 September 2013, the broadcaster announced that they would organise a multi-artist national final to select the German entry.

Before Eurovision

Unser Song für Dänemark 

Unser Song für Dänemark (English: Our Song for Denmark) was the competition that selected Germany's entry for the Eurovision Song Contest 2014. The competition took place on 13 March 2014 at the Lanxess Arena in Cologne, hosted by Barbara Schöneberger with Janin Reinhardt reporting from the green room. Like in the previous four years, the national final was co-produced by the production company Brainpool, which also co-produced the 2011 Eurovision Song Contest in Düsseldorf and the 2012 Eurovision Song Contest in Baku. Seven established acts and an eighth act selected through a wildcard round competed during the show with the winner being selected through a public televote. The show was broadcast on Das Erste as well as online via the broadcaster's Eurovision Song Contest website eurovision.de and the official Eurovision Song Contest website eurovision.tv. The national final was watched by 3.95 million viewers in Germany.

Club Concert 
Interested artists were able to apply by submitting an online application and uploading a performance clip of either a cover song or an original song via YouTube between 25 November 2013 and 22 January 2014. Singer Adel Tawil headed the campaign to encourage artists to apply. By the end of the process, it was announced that 2,240 candidates had applied for the wildcard round. The ten competing artists were selected by an expert panel consisting of representatives of NDR, Brainpool, youth-oriented and pop radio stations of ARD, record companies Universal, Sony, Warner as well as some independent labels. 

The club concert took place on 10 February 2014 at the Edelfettwerk in Hamburg, hosted by Barbara Schöneberger with Janin Reinhardt reporting from the green room. The show was broadcast on NDR Fernsehen and EinsPlus as well as online via eurovision.de and eurovision.tv. The winner, Elaiza, was selected solely by public voting, including options for landline and SMS voting. In addition to the performances of the competing entries, 2012 German Eurovision entrant Roman Lob performed his new song "All That Matters".

Competing entries 
Seven established acts were invited by NDR for the competition and were announced on 13 December 2013. The eighth participating act was selected through a Club Concert wildcard round on 27 February 2014.

Final
The televised final took place on 13 March 2014, which featured the seven established acts and Elaiza who won the wildcard round. The winner was selected through three rounds of public voting, including options for landline and SMS voting. In the first round, the eight artists performed their selected first of their two songs and the top four artists were selected to proceed to the second round. In the second round, the top four artists performed their second song and the top two entries, one song per artist, were selected to proceed to the third round. In the third round, the winner, "Is It Right" performed by Elaiza, was selected. In addition to the performances of the competing entries, 2013 Danish Eurovision entrant Emmelie de Forest, who won the Eurovision Song Contest 2013, performed her entry "Only Teardrops", while 2014 Italian Eurovision entrant Emma Marrone performed her entry "La mia città" and Adel Tawil performed his new song "Weinen".

At Eurovision

As a member of the "Big Five", Germany automatically qualified for a place in the final, held on 10 May 2014. The European Broadcasting Union approved a request from the German broadcaster for Germany to vote in the second semi-final on 8 May 2014. During the German delegation's press conference on 6 May 2014, Germany was allocated to compete in the first half of the final. In the final, the producers of the show decided that Germany would perform 12th, following Austria and preceding Sweden. Germany placed 18th in the final, scoring 39 points.

On stage, the members of Elaiza performed alone with band members Yvonne Grünwald playing the accordion, Natalie Plöger playing the contrabass and Ela Steinmetz performing lead vocals. The German performance featured paper streamers that fell over the stage during the first and last chorus.

In Germany, both the semi-finals and the final were broadcast live on EinsPlus and on delay on EinsFestival. The semi-finals were also broadcast live on Phoenix, while the final was broadcast live on Das Erste. All shows were commentated by Peter Urban. The German spokesperson revealing the result of the German vote in the final was Helene Fischer.

Voting

Points awarded to Germany

Points awarded by Germany

Detailed voting results
The following members comprised the German jury:
 Jennifer Weist (jury chairperson)frontwoman for the band Jennifer Rostock
 Madeline Obrigewitsch (Madeline Juno)singer, songwriter
 Konrad Sommermeyertalent scout, manager, songwriter
 Paul Würdig (Sido)rapper
 Andreas Bouranisinger, songwriter

References

External links 

Official NDR/ARD Eurovision site
Unser Song für Dänemark official website

2014
Countries in the Eurovision Song Contest 2014
Eurovision
Eurovision
Articles containing video clips